Tamizh Padam 2: Police Athiyayam is a 2018 Indian Tamil-language parody film written and directed by C. S. Amudhan and produced by S. Sashikanth and Ramachandra of YNOT Studios. A sequel to the successful Thamizh Padam (2010), the film stars Shiva, Iswarya Menon, Sathish, and Disha Pandey. The music was composed by Kannan with cinematography by Gopi Amarnath and editing by T. S. Suresh. The film released on 13 July 2018.

Plot 
Shiva, the universal cop, has left the police department and has returned to his hometown of Cinemapatti. He is brought back in to resolve a crisis. Once the situation is handled, he is asked to join the department by Police Commissioner Yezhusaamy, but he refuses and walks away. P, a dreaded don who poses a threat to society, kills Shiva's wife Priya by using a cell phone bomb. Shiva is forced to rejoin the police department. Meanwhile, Shiva is finding a girl to marry on his grandmother's request. His conditions for a girl are that he wants a loosu ponnu (a bubbly but crazy girl). He sees Ramya and assumes that she is crazy since she went into a mental hospital van. With the help of his friends, he proposes to her, and she accepts his love.

Shiva learns that P has fixed a bomb somewhere by the clues which were given by P's henchman Wasim Khan. Shiva finds that P has fixed a bomb in a bus. He discovers that P has fixed the bomb so if the bus is driven less or more than five kilometers per hour, it will explode. However, Shiva saves the people inside the bus. Wasim is killed by Rithika, P's henchwoman. Shiva then discovers that there was someone in the department who is informing P about their ideas. He discovers and kills Inbashekhar, the mole, and is seemingly suspended.

Shiva realizes that Ramya is not crazy but a psychiatrist, and breaks up with her. His friends advise him that he needs to reunite with her. He decides to, but Ramya has left for America. Shiva also goes there to find her, and they reunite in Central Park. Then, it is revealed that Shiva went on a mission in America so that he could catch P, and that he was not suspended. When the mission is in progress, Ramya is kidnapped and killed by P. Back in Chennai, Shiva is very sad about Ramya's death. His grandmother asks him to take her to the cemetery. She took some promises which were to kill P, marry a beautiful girl than Ramya (the girl he loved and which died), and to give her a great-grandchild.

Shiva sketches a plan to catch P by demonetising 500 and 1000 rupee notes with the help of the government. He goes to a temple to attend his friend Bharath's marriage. There, he meets Gayathri, a lookalike of Ramya, and gets shocked. He proposes to her in the next two minutes when he sees her. The demonetisation forces P to stand at an ATM queue because he had a lakh crores of 1000 rupee notes. Shiva executes his plan perfectly, but P escapes. Shiva catches him at his Kovalam beach resort. He kills him, but P comes alive and becomes the CM-elect of Tamil Nadu.

Bodhi, a saint, calls Shiva and says that P is immortal. The enmity between P and Shiva is for 76 generations. In 300 BC, King Adhiyamaan was ruling Kovai. He appointed Piyaar as the dance teacher of the kingdom, but his dance was demonic. Bharathamuni, another dancer whose dance was divine, wanted to do a dance-off with Piyaar. Adhiyamaan also said that the winner will get a jackfruit, which will give immortality to the one who eats it, and also his daughter Khaleesi will marry him, but Piyaar's henchmen kill Bharathamuni and his grandmother. As a result, Piyaar gets the jackfruit and becomes immortal.

Now, Shiva needs to go to 300 BC to win the dance-off with Piyaar. He gets a time travel watch from a watch mechanic. He goes to 300 BC, wins the dance-off, Khaleesi, and the jackfruit. He then comes back to 2018, and meets P, who kidnapped Gayathri. He reveals that he ate the jackfruit, and P is no longer immortal. He fights with his henchmen while Gayathri sings. Irritated by her singing, P kills her. Shiva also kills P and is arrested.

During the credits, Shiva is released from prison after 25 years. Worried that Shiva's romantic relationships with other women would result in their eventual deaths, his grandmother kills him, revealing her villainous "D" nature albeit being acquitted in the first film.

Cast  

 Shiva in multiple roles as:
 Shiva, the universal cop
 Barathamuni, a dancer in 300 BC who loses the dance-off to Piyaar
 Iswarya Menon in multiple roles as:
 Ramya, a psychologist whom Shiva falls in love with
 Gayathri, Ramya's lookalike 
 Khaleesi, Adhiyamaan's daughter
 Sathish in multiple roles as:
 P (Pandiya), a dreaded don
 Piyaar, the dance teacher of Kovai who wins a dance-off against Barathamuni
 Disha Pandey as Priya, Shiva's wife who is killed by P
 Kalairani (replacing Paravai Muniyamma from the first film) as Shiva's grandmother (D) and Barathamuni's grandmother 
 Santhana Bharathi (replacing M. S. Bhaskar from the first film) as Nakul, Shiva's friend
 Manobala as Siddharth, Shiva's friend
 R. Sundarrajan (replacing Vennira Aadai Moorthy from the first film) as Bharath, Shiva's friend
 Nizhalgal Ravi as Inbasekhar
 Chetan as Police Commissioner B. Yezhusaamy
 Ajay Rathnam as King Adhiyamaan, the ruler of Kovai in 300 BC who appointed Piyaar as the dance master
 Gerard Pio as Bodhi, a saint, and the watch mechanic (voice for Bodhi character given by C. S. Amudhan)
 O. A. K. Sundar as Wasim Khan, P's henchman who is killed by Ritika
 George Vijay as Paramu
 Jiiva in a special appearance
 Venkat Prabhu in a special appearance 
 Premgi in a special appearance
 Kasthuri as in a special appearance as an item dancer 
 S. Sashikanth in a special appearance in the song "Naan Yaarumilla"

Production 
Director C. S. Amudhan confirmed that pre-production work was underway for a sequel to Thamizh Padam (2010) during July 2017. The film would feature Shiva reprising the lead role, while S. Sashikanth of YNOT Studios would be the main producer. After initially attempting to recruit Oviya to the cast, the makers chose to retain Disha Pandey from the first film, while actress Iswarya Menon was added to the cast. Sathish, who portrayed a minor role in the first film, was signed to play a larger role in the sequel. Kannan and T. S. Suresh who were part of first film was retained as composer and editor respectively, while Nirav Shah's commitments to Shankar's science-fiction film 2.0 (2018) meant that cinematography duties were assigned to Gopi Amarnath. Gerard Pio, the assistant director of the film, also starred in the film in a supporting role.

The film began with a launch event on 8 December 2017 held in Chennai, with the shoot beginning thereafter. Two promotional posters for the film were released soon after the start of production, parodying the torrent site Tamil Rockers and former Tamil Nadu Chief Minister O. Panneerselvam's dramatic late-night meditation session at Marina Beach following his resignation.

On June 21, 2018, the director announced title change from the originally announced title Tamizh Padam 2.0 to Tamizh Padam 2.

Soundtrack 

All songs were composed by N. Kannan, who earlier composed for the director's previous ventures. The soundtrack was released by Think Music.

List of notable spoofs 
In Thamizh Padam, the director parodied only Tamil films, but in this movie, he spoofs Tamil films as well as American and Hindi films.

Films 

16 Vayathinile (1977) - One of P's disguises is Rajinikanth's character of Parattai from this film.
2.0 (2018) - P disguises as the character, 'Pakshirajan' from this film
24 (2016) - The watch mechanic and his time travel watch from this film are spoofed.
7aum Arivu (2011) - The character of Bodhidharma is spoofed. The song "Kalavarame" contains several callbacks to the "Mun Andhi" visualizations from this film.
Aadukalam (2011)
Aambala (2015) -  Shiva's introduction scene is based on the flying SUV sequence, originally featuring Vishal.
Amaidhi Padai (1994) - Sathyaraj's halwa box is a hat tip to the famous scene where he gives it to Kasthuri.
Anbanavan Asaradhavan Adangadhavan (2017)
Anniyan (2005) - One of P's disguises is this film's title character.
Annamalai (1992) -The song "Naan Yaarumilla" contains a lyrical line which parodies the line "Ennai Vaazha Vaithathu" from the song "Vanthenda Paalkaran".
Appu (2000) - One of P's disguises is the villain played by Prakash Raj in this film.
Aramm (2017)
Baahubali -  The scene where Bharathamuni and his grandmother try to escape their attackers is a parody of Sivagami escaping with the child from the first film of this series. The film ends with a parody of the infamous Kattappa stabbing scene. The dialogue "Ithuvei en kattalai, en kattalaiye saasanam" is parodied. One of the film's promotional posters showing Shiva carrying "U" parodies Prabhas carrying Shivalinga from this film. 
Baasha (1995) - P spoofs 'Hey Hey Hey' dialogue from Baasha's interrogation scene.
Bairavaa (2017) - The lyrics "Varlam Vaa" of the theme song of the film are sung in the title song while Shiva reverses his car.
Billa (2007) - Shiva sits in the swimming pool like the way Ajith Kumar did in the film.
Black Panther (2018) - Shiva's return to Cinemapatti - dry lands from outside but a modern city on the inside (similar to Wakanda).
Chatriyan (1990) - The whole scene of Vijayakanth's joining the police force back and his reason is a spoof of this movie.
Chinna Gounder (1992) - One of the film's promotional posters is based on this film.
Kadhal Desam (1996) - "Kalluri Saalai" is named here as "Palli Saalai", the instrumental theme of the song and flowers falling on the road is based on this film.
Enter the Dragon (1973)  - One of P's disguises is the villain Han from this film.
Enthiran (2010) - One of P's disguises is the evil version of Chitti. The scene where Shiva looks for a Karuppu Aadu (black sheep) is based on this movie.
Friends (2001) - Shiva mentions the dialogue "Aaniye Pudinga Venam" from this film.
Forrest Gump (1994) - Shiva sits on a park bench and delivers the line about life being like a box of chocolates.
Game of Thrones - The characters of Daenerys Targaryen, Tyrion Lannister and the tagline "Winter is coming" are spoofed.
Guardians of the Galaxy (2014) - Shiva challenges P to a dance-off, similarly done by Star-Lord.
I (2015) - The dialogue "Adhukkum Mela" is parodied.
Irudhi Suttru (2016) - P's henchwoman is based on the character of Madhi, and is even named Ritika after the actress who played her.
Irumbu Thirai (2018) - The main character speaks about information security to the audience.
James Bond (franchise)
Kaakha Kaakha (2003) - The item number contains elements of the "Thoodhu Varuma" song.
Kaala (2018) - This film's first-look poster is parodied by Tamizh Padam 2 promotional poster. Poster shows Shiva holding a dinosaur instead of dog from the original.
Kabali (2016) - The final scene where Shiva is released from jail is based on this film. "Neruppuda" is parodied as "Paruppuda" in the song "Naan Yaarumilla".
Puli (2015) - Choreography and concept of the song En Nadanam is a parody of the song Mannavanae Mannavanae from Puli. Sathish's hairstyle in the period flashback is based on Sudeep's look in this film.
Kaththi (2014) - The extended press conference scene, as well as the hero explaining a concept using idli, is based on this film.
Kanthaswamy (2009) - Vikram sings under the water in the song "Excuse Me Mr. Kanthaswamy". That scene was parodied in the end of "Kalavarame" song.
Ko (2011) - After a supporting character dies, Jiiva appears and advises the lead couple to go for a song sequence. This parodies the setup of the "Venpaniye" song from this film.
Maan Karate (2014) - Sathish mimicks Sivakartikeyan's pose from the title poster in the song "En Nadanam"
Maanaadu (2019) - This film's first-look poster is parodied by Tamizh Padam 2 promotional poster
Maari (2015) - Paramu while describing about P mentions him being a lover of birds.
Madras (2014) - A political poster of V. I. S. Jayapalan's character is in the film.
Maragatha Naanayam (2017) - Lorry from this film can be seen in the song "Naan Yaarumilla"
Mankatha (2011) - One of P's disguises is based on Vinayak Mahadev, the dialogue "Money Money" and theme music is also parodied. Shiva's introductory scene of getting down from the car parodies Ajith's intro scene from the film.
Men in Black - Shiva's bodyguards are dressed like the characters in the series.
Mersal (2017) - A character being hit by a vehicle for shock value is based on similar scenes from the films of Atlee. P while speaking to Shiva utters Vijay's famous dialogue "Nee Patra Vaitha Neruppondru" from the film. Shiva imitating Vijay's hand gesture while getting arrested is based on this film.
Muthu (1995) - The song "Vidukathaiya" is parodied. The parody of Rajini's famous dialogue "Naan Eppo Varuven" from this film is used in the song "Naan Yaarumilla".
M.S. Dhoni: The Untold Story (2016) - In the song "Phoenix Paravai", in one of the shots Shiva would be seen bowling.
Nadigaiyar Thilagam (2018) - This film is parodied by Tamizh Padam 2 promotional poster 
Neethaane En Ponvasantham (2012) - A scene and dialogue featuring the hero singing to the heroine on a terrace is based on this film.
Nooravathu Naal (1984) - One of P's disguises is based on this film's villain played by Sathyaraj.
O Kadhal Kanmani (2015) - The heroine wears a T-shirt saying "Mental Manadhil".
Onaayum Aattukkuttiyum (2013) - The two blind violinists playing in the abandoned underground parking area are based on this film.
Pisaasu (2014) - The two blind violinists playing in the abandoned underground parking area are based on this film.
Polladhavan (2007)
Pokkiri (2007) - Shiva speaks a line spoken by Vijay, the hero of this film.
Rajini Murugan (2016) - The lines spoken at the start of the "Yennamma Ipdi Panreengalema" song are parodied.
Ra.One (2011) - The position maintained by P when he returns from the dead is similar to Ra.One reassembly in the film.
Rekka (2016)- Kalavarame song choreography and location are a parody of Kanna Kaatu Podhum song.
Remo (2016) - The character played by Santhana Bharathi disguises himself as a nurse as does the hero of this film, leading to a similar proposal scene.
Romeo Juliet (2015)
Roja (1992) - The character Wasim Khan is based on a character from this film.
Saamy (2003) - A scene where the heroine foils a villain's attack by throwing a tiffin box is parodied.
Santosh Subramaniam (2008) - Genelia D'Souza, the heroine of this film, is mentioned in a conversation due to her character's nature.
Sarkar (2018) - This film's first look poster is parodied in Tamizh Padam 2 promotional poster
Saroja (2008) - This film's director Venkat Prabhu and actor Premgi Amaren appear for a song and perform dance steps from "Kodana Kodi".
Sindhu Bhairavi - This film is parodied by Tamizh Padam 2 promotional poster.
Singam (2010) - The character played by Nizhalgal Ravi here is based on the same one he portrayed in this film. The film also pokes fun at holding press conferences to announce undercover operations.
Sivaji (2007)
Speed (1994) - The bus rescue scene from this film is parodied.
Terminator 2: Judgment Day (1991)  - P returns to life in the form of liquid metal, based on a scene in this film.
Thaanaa Serndha Koottam (2018) - The sentence "Ithu Thaana Serndha Kootam, idhu ellam junior artist" is referred to in the song "Naan Yaarumilla".
Thalaivaa (2013)
The Godfather (1972)
The Silence of the Lambs (1991) - One of P's disguises is based on Hannibal Lecter from this film.
Theeran Adhigaaram Ondru (2017) - Shiva enters a scene by burrowing up from the sand, as Karthi, the hero of this film did.
Theri (2016) - This film is parodied by Tamizh Padam 2 promotional poster.
Thuppakki (2012) - The rooftop conversation between Shiva and the corrupt policeman is based on this film. The dialogue "I'm waiting" is also parodied during the pre-interval scene.
Thupparivaalan (2017) - Shiva dresses up as Vishal, the title character of this film, when he needs to solve a mystery.
The Dark Knight (2008) - This film is parodied by Tamizh Padam 2 promotional poster.
Thevar Magan (1992) - The disguises of Shiva and P, the subsequent fight and Shiva's arrest in the climax and the song in the background are all based on this film.
Tik Tik Tik (2018) - This film is parodied by Tamizh Padam 2 promotional poster.
Trisha Illana Nayanthara (2015) - P's henchman uses a famous line "Virgin pasanga saabam unna summa vidaadhu" from this film.
Twilight (2008) - The look of Manobala's character.
Uttama Villain (2015) - Barathamuni's look is based on Uthaman from this film.
Vaaranam Aayiram (2008) - Like Suriya from this film, here Shiva travels to America carrying a guitar to meet his lover.
Vallarasu (2000) -The character Wazim Khan and Shiva's dialogues about India Pakistan unity is based on this film.
Vedalam (2015) - Shiva's transformation from meek to tough, and the subsequent fight with thugs is a take-off on this film's scene.
Veeram (2014) - The plot of this film is mentioned in a conversation.
Velaiilla Pattadhari (2014) - Shiva rides a bicycle similar to the one owned by Dhanush, the hero of this film.
Vettaiyaadu Vilaiyaadu (2006) - Shiva uses his "instinct" often. An American FBI agent who aides Shiva is named Anderson.
Vinnaithaandi Varuvaayaa (2010) - The character's inner monologues, and the openings of the songs "Hosanna" and "Aaromale" are parodied.
Vivegam (2017) - The plot is mentioned in a conversation; a training montage features an exercise scene from this film; the line "Varen ma" is uttered by the hero; several lines reference the "Phoenix paravai"; the scene where the heroine starts singing during the final fight is parodied.
Vikram (1986) - The davidpulla reference to the killer of Siva's wife is a spoof of 1986 spy movie Vikram where the hero refers to the killer of his wife in the same expletive and survived the Censor cut.   
Vikram Vedha (2017) - The interrogation scene between P's henchman and Shiva and theme music parodies a scene from this film.
Vishwaroopam (2013) - Two of P's disguises are based on this film's villain played by Rahul Bose.
Walter Vetrivel (1992) - When P becomes Chief Minister, Shiva is forced to give slippers to him.
X-Men: Days of Future Past - Shiva goes back in time to alter the events of the 15th century.
Yennai Arindhaal (2015)

People 
Aishwarya Rajinikanth - The girl dancers in the periodic flashback imitates Aishwarya's dance steps during her performance at UNESCO.
Angelina Jolie - When Shiva arrives in America, he tells the police commissioner that Angelina picked him up.
Ajith Kumar - His act of disbanding fan clubs, his motto of "Live let live" and his style of walking is mentioned in the song "Naan Yaarumilla".
Banwarilal Purohit - In one of the scenes, before entering office "P" pats a women's cheek and says "Naan Unakku Thatha Maathiri" (I'm like your grandpa).
Dhanush - When George explains about P's flashback to Siva, he uses films of Dhanush as references.
Gangai Amaren - Shiva is a fan of Gangai Amaren's music, rather than the common A. R. Rahman or Ilayaraja.
Gautham Vasudev Menon - Voice narrating about protagonist and his romantic life is similar to the films directed by Gautham Menon. The film's director Amuthan himself provided voice over for these scenes.
Narendra Modi 
H. Raja - His remark "You're an Anti-Indian" has been parodied here as "Anti-American".
Kamal Haasan - His emotional statement of going to another country during the time of Vishwaroopam controversy has been parodied. The slogan of his show Bigg Boss and the dialogue about forgiveness "Mannikkaravan Manushan" from his film Virumaandi has also been parodied.
O. Panneerselvam - OPS's meditation in Jayalalitha's tomb and him getting emotional while taking oath as chief minister has been parodied.
Rajinikanth - The opening credits of Superstar Rajinikanth are used. The song "Naan Yaarumilla" contains a modified version of the dialogue "Naan Yepo Varuven, Epadi Varuven".
Silambarasan - His statement "Enakku Nadikka Theriyadhu" from Jodi No 1. is used in the song "Naan Yaarumilla".
Sivakarthikeyan - His statement "En Producer-ku Car-ae Illai" during a press conference of Remo (2016) parodied in the song "Naan Yaarumilla".
Sunny Leone - To figure out where the bomb is, Shiva asks for Leone's body size.
Vetrimaaran - Vada Chennai and Visaranai are mentioned.
V. K. Sasikala - Sasikala's oath on Jayalalitha's tomb has been parodied.
Vijayakanth - His statement "Thookki Adichuruven Paathukka" is used in the song "Naan Yaarumilla".
Vijay Mallya - A wine shop and bank are named "Mallaya Sarbath Kadai" and "Mallya Bank" respectively.
Vishal - His statement "Mandapam Kattitu than Kalyanam" is used in the song "Naan Yaarumilla".
Tamilisai Soundararajan
T. Rajender - During the audio launch of Puli (2015), his speech of praising Vijay using film's title as analogy is parodied in the end of the song "Naan Yaarumilla".
Virat Kohli - To figure out where the bomb is, Shiva asks a question about Kohli.

Others 
2016 Indian banknote demonetisation - Demonetization is announced by the Prime Minister during the plot, which results in all of P's cash assets to become invalid.
Aavin Milk - The brand is mentioned in the song "Naan Yaarumilla".
Beep Song - Lines from Beep song is used in the lyrics of "Evada Unna Patha".
Bigg Boss Tamil - The slogan of the show's first season "Odavum Mudiyathu Oliyum Mudivathu" is used in the song "Naan Yaarumilla".
Evan Di Unna Pethan - This song was parodied here by portraying girls criticizing their lovers for cheating them in the name of love.
Kaveri delta coal-bed methane project - Used in the song "Naan Yaarumilla" indirectly mocking film actors' apathy towards social issues.
Koovathur resort - One of the scenes shows few politicians enjoying themselves in the resort of "P".
Kadhal En Kadhal (Adi Da Avala) - The line "Adida Avala" is used in the song "Evan Da Unna" is changed as "Adida Avana".
Nadigar Sangam
PETA - Used in the song "Naan Yaarumilla" indirectly mocking film actors' apathy towards social issues.
Redmi Smartphones - Used as a bomb to kill Shiva's wife Priya. This is a parody of the notoriety of some exploding Redmi smartphones.
Thanthi TV - This channel is parodied here as "Thabaal TV".

Soundtrack
Naan Yaarumilla - This song parodies dialogues and real-life statements uttered by film actors while also mocks real-life issues such as methane and PETA.
Vaa Vaa Kaama - This song parodies item songs in police oriented films where dancer sings eulogizing the film's protagonist and his achievements.
Kalavaram - The song parodies romantic duets in Tamil cinema.
Ulagam Athira -This song and the scene parodies song "Veriyera" and climax scene from Vivegam (2017).
Phoenix Paravai - The song's tune is a parody of the song "Pazham Neeyappa" from Thiruvilaiyadal (1965).
Evada Unna Paatha - This song parodies love failure songs in Tamil cinema, here the genders are reversed.

Release and reception
Tamil Nadu theatrical rights of the film were sold for 3.5 crore. The satellite rights of the film were sold to STAR Vijay.

Sify wrote "On the whole, Tamizh Padam 2 is fun unlimited. [..] Sometimes, a good laugh is all you need to make your day." Behindwoods wrote "Combining the emotions and famed moments of many films and personalities in the same scene was noteworthy. Amudhan and his team have put to use, all these combinations to bring out a full-fledged entertainer." Cinema Express wrote "While the film's willingness to let nobody off the hook is truly refreshing, the comedy doesn't work nearly as often as it should". Times of India wrote "First things first — Tamizh Padam 2 offers what's expected from it. With a slew of spoof scenes taking potshots at umpteen number of Tamil movies, the unique attempt works this time, too." Hindustan Times wrote "While the film is a laugh riot, it lacks the freshness Tamizh Padam had. It works as a sequel because the films and themes they have picked are relatable. However, lack of freshness can reduce this franchise to a formula too."

Box office
The film collected  in Chennai in three days.

References

External links 

2018 films
2010s Tamil-language films
Films shot in Chennai
Indian parody films
2010s parody films
Indian sequel films
Films shot in Malaysia
Films about time travel